Christin Priebst (born 18 September 1983) is a German short track speed skater. She competed at the 2002 Winter Olympics and the 2006 Winter Olympics.

References

External links
 

1983 births
Living people
German female short track speed skaters
Olympic short track speed skaters of Germany
Short track speed skaters at the 2002 Winter Olympics
Short track speed skaters at the 2006 Winter Olympics
Sportspeople from Dresden
21st-century German women